Alberto Regazzoni (born 4 May 1983) is a footballer from Switzerland who currently plays as left winger for AC Sementina. He has also played for the Swiss national squad.

He started his career at FC Lugano, after the club faced bankruptcy near the end of 2002–03 season, he transferred to FC Malcantone Agno. In 2006 he came on as a substitute and scored the winning penalty in the shootout as Sion defeated BSC Young Boys in the Swiss Cup Final.

Honours 
Sion
Swiss Cup: 2005–06

References

External links
 
 

1983 births
Living people
Swiss men's footballers
Switzerland international footballers
BSC Young Boys players
FC Sion players
FC Lugano players
FC Chiasso players
Swiss Super League players
Sportspeople from Lugano
Association football wingers
Association football forwards